Senator Shober may refer to:

Francis Edwin Shober (1831–1896), North Carolina State Senate
Howard C. Shober (1859–1956), South Dakota State Senate